The Mercury Villager is a minivan that was marketed by the Mercury division of Ford.  The first of two minivans sold by Mercury, two generations were sold from the 1993 to 2002 model years.  Competing against the Chrysler minivans and the General Motors APV minivans, the front-wheel drive Villager was introduced between the Ford Aerostar and the Ford Windstar.

Throughout its production, the Villager was a product of a joint venture between Ford and Nissan; developed by both manufacturers, the Villager and the Nissan Quest were produced by Ford at its Ohio Assembly plant in Avon Lake, Ohio (alongside the Ford Econoline/Club Wagon).

After the 2002 model year, Mercury discontinued the Villager, replacing the model line for the 2004 model year with a revived Monterey (a Mercury counterpart of the Ford Freestar).

Background

Nameplate
The Edsel division of Ford introduced the Villager nameplate for the 1958 model year, with the Edsel Villager serving as its mid-range station wagon.  Offered in a four-door configuration with a fully-painted exterior, the Villager was marketed through the 1960 model year.  Following the demise of Edsel, Mercury reintroduced the Villager nameplate for the 1962 model year as part of the Comet compact series.  Again denoting a station wagon, the Comet Villager was offered with simulated woodgrain trim.

From 1962 to 1984, Mercury marketed the Villager as the Mercury counterpart of the Ford "Squire" trim, denoting wood-trim station wagons (excluding the full-size Mercury Colony Park).  The Comet Villager was produced from 1962 to 1967 and was followed by five more uses of the Villager name, including the Montego (1970–1976), Bobcat (1975–1980), Cougar (1977 and 1982), Zephyr (1978–1981) and Lynx (1981–1984).

Following the introduction of the 1983 Marquis, the Villager nameplate was dropped from wood-trim station wagons; while offered with wood trim, the Marquis adopted the Brougham name (the Mercury Sable that replaced it was never offered with the option).

Development 

At the beginning of 1988, Ford and Nissan entered a joint venture to develop an all-new minivan sold by both automakers.  Under the terms of the agreement, the development and engineering of the vehicles was done by Nissan (in the United States); the company also supplied the engine and transmission.  Ford would manufacture the vehicles in its own facility, providing components for the vehicle.

Development officially commenced later that year, codenamed VX54.  The program would replace two existing Nissan product lines developed in Japan (the Van and the Axxess) and Ford would market its version as a Mercury (the VX54 program coincided with the simultaneous development of the WIN88 program, later the Ford Windstar).  The final designs were chosen by Nissan in 1989, with both companies commencing testing of prototypes in 1990; real-world testing was done through 1991, as development concluded at the end of that year.

During the 1980s, family-use vehicles transitioned from full-size station wagons towards minivans.  In place of the full-size Mercury Colony Park, during the development process, designers benchmarked the mid-size as its goal for features, ride, and handling.  Along with deriving the front lightbar grille from the Sable, the Villager adopted its two-way liftgate (hatchback rear window) from the station wagon.

While all-wheel drive was initially planned in the VX54 program, slow sales of Chrysler AWD minivans led to Ford dropping it from development of the Villager.

First generation (1993–1998)
Launched in July 1992 as a 1993 model, the Mercury Villager was introduced at the 1992 Chicago Auto Show.  Introduced alongside the Nissan Quest, the 1992 Mercury Villager was the first Mercury since 1960 produced without a Ford counterpart.

Chassis specification 
The first-generation Villager uses the front-wheel drive Ford VX54 platform. While using a Ford codename, the platform is an evolution of the 1989-1994 Nissan Maxima (J30 chassis).  Using a 112.2-inch wheelbase, the chassis shares nearly an identical wheelbase with a standard-wheelbase 1984-1995 Chrysler minivan (an inch longer than a short-wheelbase Chevrolet Astro).

The Villager uses MacPherson struts for the front suspension and leaf springs for the solid rear axle.  The front brakes were vented discs with rear drums (Rear disc brakes were included on models eqipped with the trailer towing package); anti-lock brakes were fitted as standard equipment.

Powertrain 
The first-generation Villager (and its Quest counterpart) was powered by a single engine through its production.  Sharing its engine with the Nissan Maxima, the Villager was powered by a 3.0L Nissan VG30E V6 (detuned from 160 to 151 horsepower).  A Jatco-supplied 4-speed automatic was the sole transmission offering.

In the development of the VX54 model line, Ford requested several design changes from Nissan before it would use the engine.  Along with making the VG30E a non-interference engine, Ford requested the addition of an oil level sensor and the relocation of the oil filter assembly (for better access).

Body design 

At 190 inches long, the first-generation Villager nearly matches the extended-length 1991–1995 Chrysler minivans in length.  In contrast to the Aerostar, the Villager was produced solely as a passenger van and in a single body length.  All versions were produced with single sliding door.

In line with the Mercury Sable and Mercury Topaz sedans, the Villager was distinguished from its Nissan Quest counterpart by its front lightbar grille.  While the Quest was styled with a monochromatic exterior (for all trims), the Villager used multiple two-toned exterior trims (base trims used wide gray moldings, in line with the 1992 Grand Marquis).  To aid aerodynamics, the exterior door handles were faired into the doors.  In a minivan first, the rear liftgate was modeled after compact station wagons; the rear window opened independently from the door.

For 1996, the exterior underwent a mid-cycle revision.  A conventional grille (modeled after the Sable and Mystique) replaced the lightbar, with restyled taillamps (joined by a red panel), badging, and the introduction of monochromatic exterior trim (for lower trims).

While the exterior and interior of the vehicle was designed primarily by Nissan, many interior components were sourced from Ford.  In line with the Aerostar, the Villager was equipped with optional rear-seat radio controls and air-conditioning vents.  Along with folding/removable second-row seats (bench or bucket, dependent on trim), the third-row bench seat was mounted on sliding tracks, allowing the interior to be reconfigured (for passengers or cargo) without its removal.  To meet passive-restraint requirements, the Villager was initially equipped with automatic seatbelts (the only American-market minivan to do so); for 1994, a driver-side airbag was added, with dual airbags becoming standard for 1996 (replacing the automatic seatbelts).

Trim 

For 1993, the Villager was offered with GS and LS trim levels, in line with Mercury sedans.  The second-row seat of the GS was a two-passenger bench seat; the LS was available with either a bench seat or two bucket seats.  At its launch, the exterior of the GS was produced with wide gray door/bumper moldings (similar to the 1992 Grand Marquis), switching to monochromatic trim for the 1996 model year (with optional two-tone trim); the LS was offered with standard two-tone trim from 1993 to 1998.

Villager Nautica 

In 1994, Mercury introduced the Nautica special edition of the Villager.  In line with Eddie Bauer-edition Ford vehicles (including the Aerostar minivan), the trim denoted the namesake clothing company.  Externally denoted by a blue-and-white color scheme (with a yellow pinstripe), the Nautica was fitted with multi-color leather seats (blue with white inserts); a complimentary luggage set included Nautica-designed duffel bags.  For the 1996, multiple two-tone color schemes joined the blue/white exterior.

Second generation (1999–2002)

For the 1999 model year, Mercury introduced the second-generation Villager. Again a counterpart of the Nissan Quest, the 1999 Villager shared no sheetmetal with its predecessor. As with the larger Ford Windstar, a central change of the redesign included the addition of a second sliding door.

Chassis specification 
Carried over from the previous generation, the Ford VX54 platform underpinned the second-generation Mercury Villager and Nissan Quest, sharing its 112.2-inch wheelbase.  Retuned for a softer ride,  the second-generation Villager retained its suspension configuration from the previous generation, including front MacPherson struts and a rear beam axle.  The front brakes were vented discs with rear drum brakes; ABS was offered as an option.

Powertrain 
The second-generation Villager received a new V6 engine, again supplied by Nissan.  For 1999, the 3.3L VG33E V6 replaced the previous 3.0L V6; producing 170 hp, the engine was shared with Nissan light trucks and SUVs in the United States.  A Jatco-supplied 4-speed automatic was the sole transmission paired with the engine.

Body design 

While sharing its wheelbase with its predecessor, the second-generation Villager was five inches longer than its predecessor; slightly larger than the Toyota Sienna, the Villager was approximately six inches shorter than the extended-length GM and Chrysler minivans (and the Ford Windstar).  In contrast to its competitors (except the Chrysler Town & Country), the second-generation Villager/Quest was sold solely with two sliding doors, abandoning the previous single side-door configuration.

While again sharing most body stampings, the exterior of the second-generation Quest and Villager were designed separately, with Ford designer Moray Callum responsible for the exterior of the Villager.  In place of the chrome-ringed horizontal grille, the Villager adopted a waterfall-style grille (with a much larger Mercury emblem); the rear fascia was given a red trim panel between the taillamps (with amber turn signals).  Several design features from the first generation made a return, including the design of the exterior door handles and the two-way rear liftgate.

Carrying over the reconfigurable 3rd-row seat design from the previous generation, the cargo area was revised with the addition of a removable parcel shelf.  For 2000, a 3-person 2nd-row seat was introduced (increasing capacity to 8) as an option.  As a $1,295 option, a rear-seat entertainment system was introduced, including a flip-down LCD screen connected to a VCR or video-game console.

For 2001, the front and rear fascias were revised; the Mercury emblem was centered and enlarged on the grille and liftgate (the foglamps were changed to round lenses).  The instrument panel was redesigned (the electronic instrument panel returned as an option).

Trim 

Abandoning the GS/LS trim nomenclature used by the previous generation, the second-generation Villager was offered in three trim levels:  Villager, Villager Sport, and Villager Estate; the special-edition Nautica trim was discontinued. Externally, the standard Villager was offered in monochromatic colors or with a silver lower body; the Sport was painted with a gray lower body and received upgraded suspension settings and larger wheels and tires.  The Estate was distinguished by a gold lower body, wheels, and badging.

Sales

Chinese production 
From 1995 to 2001, the first-generation Mercury Villager was marketed by Chinese auto manufacturers through the use of CKD kits.  Guangzhou Yunbao (today part of Dongfeng Fengshen) marketed the Yunbao YB6480; traditionally using CKD vehicles from Nissan, the YB6480 retained its Mercury badging.  As largely the same vehicle, Dongfeng Fengshen marketed the Villager as the Fengshen EQ6482.  While the bodies were manufactured in the United States (for CKD purposes), the engines were manufactured in China (marketed through manufacturers in joint ventures with Nissan).

Through its passenger car division, Guangdong Bus Works produced the GDK6480; with nearly all assembly completed in the United States, only a few parts were added to the vehicle in China.

Replacement  

In 2000, Ford and Nissan chose to end their joint venture, as both companies had commenced design work on new generations of the Ford Windstar and the Nissan Quest. Following a shortened 2002 model year, the Ford-Nissan joint venture was concluded. The final Mercury Villager was assembled on June 27, 2002.

After skipping the 2003 model year, both Mercury and Nissan were to reenter the minivan segment. A third generation of the Quest was developed and manufactured by Nissan in the United States (derived from the Maxima), while Mercury replaced the Villager with the Monterey, a counterpart of the Freestar (as Ford had renamed the Windstar), intended to compete directly against the Chrysler Town & Country.

References

Villager
Minivans
Front-wheel-drive vehicles
2000s cars
Cars introduced in 1992